Geokaun Mountain is the highest mountain on Valentia Island, County Kerry.

Geography 
On Geokaun's northern face the  Fogher Cliffs meet the sea.

From the summit there are views of the Skellig Islands, Dingle Peninsula, the Blasket Islands, Beginish Island, Cahersiveen, Portmagee and MacGillycuddy's Reeks, including three of Ireland's six highest mountains: Carrauntoohil, Beenkeragh and Caher.

Access

The summit of Geokaun Mountain is privately owned, and a fee is required to access the mountain via the main track to the summit.

Situated along the main path up the mountain are 4 viewing areas with 36 information plaques on topics of social, environmental and historical interest in the area. These plaques include information on subjects such as:

 The Skellig Islands
 The first transatlantic telegraph cable
 Bray Tower
 St Brendan's Well
 The Knight of Kerry
 Local birdlife
 Seine fishing
 Valentia Island lighthouse
 The tetrapod trackway

See also
List of mountains in Ireland
 List of Marilyns in Ireland

References

External links
 Geokaun Mountain – Official Geokaun Mountain tourist website

Mountains and hills of County Kerry
Marilyns of Ireland